Moses J. Moseley (December 23, 1990 – January 26, 2022) was an American actor, writer and model. He was known for his work on the series The Walking Dead. He had guest starring roles on the TV shows Queen of the South and Watchmen, and appeared in the film Volumes of Blood: Horror Stories. Moses also starred in Attack of the Southern Fried Zombies.

Early life and education
Moseley was born in Aiken, South Carolina, on December 24, 1990.

Career
While a student at Georgia State University, Moseley was scouted to appear in the movie Joyful Noise with Queen Latifah and Dolly Parton.
Moseley received his breakthrough role as one of Michonne's jaw-less pet walkers on AMC's horror drama television series The Walking Dead.

Death
On January 16, 2022, Moseley's body was discovered near the Hudson bridge in Stockbridge, Georgia,  bearing evidence of a gunshot wound. He was 31 at the time of his death.

Filmography

References

External links
 
 
 
 

1990 births
2022 deaths
21st-century American male actors
African-American male actors
American male film actors
American male television actors
People from Aiken, South Carolina
Male actors from South Carolina
Georgia State University alumni
Deaths by firearm in Georgia (U.S. state)